The 1936–37 season was Port Vale's 31st season of football in the English Football League, and their first season (second overall) back in the Third Division North following their relegation from the Second Division. For the first time in the club's history, rivals Stoke City were playing two leagues above them. The "Valiants" played in white shirts and black socks – a look that they kept for the rest of the century and beyond. Manager Warney Cresswell would prove to be the first of Vale's managers to be recognizable as a manager to modern observers, training the players to ensure fitness, allowing them to relax together as a group, and searching the country for fresh talent. His modern techniques were not enough to ensure promotion, despite a mid-season unbeaten run of thirteen games in an otherwise unremarkable season.

Overview

Third Division North
During the pre-season build-up, former England international full-back Warney Cresswell was appointed as manager-coach, filling a position which had remained vacant since September 1936. Described as 'a very knowledgeable man about football', he increased the playing staff to twenty, signing winger Gerry Kelly (Chester); right-half Tommy Ward (Grimsby Town); and left-half Spencer Evans (Altrincham). Cresswell also began running the players and pushing them in the gym, in order to get them fit for the season. In between heavy training sessions he encouraged the players to relax with snooker and billiards competitions. The club also decided to introduce a new strip of white shirts and black shorts, a look they retain to this day.

The season opened with two defeats, as Vale found it tough to acclimatize to third tier football, their 3–1 home defeat to Hull City came despite them doing the double over the "Tigers" the previous season. Following this, George Stabb transferred to Bradford Park Avenue, in a deal which saw Tom Nolan return to The Old Recreation Ground. Continuing their poor form, by the end of September they were seventh from bottom. This prompted Cresswell to sign inside-forward Alfred Dickinson from Everton. On 26 September, Nolan scored a hat-trick past Stockport County, but the Vale would have to wait a little longer before getting into their stride. Seven changes were made for the 24 October win over Hartlepools United, and the wait would be worth it, as Vale then went on a thirteen-game unbeaten run. Nevertheless, Cresswell continued to travel the country in the hunt for talented young amateurs. By the end of October the 40,000 Shilling Fund completed its mission. With Ward scoring two hat-tricks during the spell, Michael Curley and George Heywood were judged as surplus to requirements, and moved on to Colwyn Bay and Southport respectively. Fred Obrey also proved to be a revelation in the centre of the pitch.

By the time Vale lost their unbeaten run – 1–0 at struggling Darlington's Feethams – they were up to fourth in the table. Vale were then in indifferent form for the remainder of the season, as their promotion hopes petered away. On 27 March a heavy 7–1 defeat was recorded to Mansfield Town at Field Mill. Cresswell's contract was cancelled by mutual consent, and he quickly took up the management reins at Third Division South side Northampton Town.

They finished in eleventh position with 44 points. This meant they were sixteen points short of promotion and twelve points clear of the re-election zones. With 58 goals scored they had the third weakest attack in the division, and had almost half the tally of runners-up Lincoln City.

Finances
On the financial side, a profit of £401 was made, though £1,923 of income came through the Shilling Fund. Gate receipts had tailed off by another £1,065; whilst the wage bill was trimmed to £5,656 and a transfer credit of £465 was made. Fourteen players departed at the season's end, including: Ken Gunn (sold to Creswell's Northampton Town); Eric Hayward (sold to Blackpool); goalkeeper Allan Todd (refused terms and was transferred to Nottingham Forest); fourteen year club veteran Roger Jones (retirement); and Gerry Kelly (signed with Southampton). The club also petitioned the Football League for a switch to the Third Division South, where gates were believed to be higher, however the League replied that circumstance and not applications determined where club's were placed – despite this Mansfield Town were the ones transferred, Mansfield being a town some forty miles north of Stoke-on-Trent.

Cup competitions
In the FA Cup, they fell at the Third Round to First Division Sheffield Wednesday with a 2–0 defeat at Hillsborough, having been forced to play six reserves due to injury. In the short-lived Football League Third Division North Cup, the club progressed to the semi-finals with victories over Mansfield Town (2–0), Stockport County (4–0), and Rotherham United (1–0); where they lost 3–0 to Chester. Attendances of around 100 exemplified the lack of interest in the competition.

League table

Results
Port Vale's score comes first

Football League Third Division North

Results by matchday

Matches

FA Cup

Third Division North Cup

Player statistics

Appearances

Top scorers

Transfers

Transfers in

Transfers out

References
Specific

General

Port Vale F.C. seasons
Port Vale